The Hong Kong Museum of Art (HKMoA) is the first and main art museum of Hong Kong, located in Salisbury Road, Tsim Sha Tsui. It is managed by the Leisure and Cultural Services Department of the Hong Kong Government. HKMoA has an art collection of over 17,000 items. Admission is free for permanent exhibitions. Its rival is the non-government-managed Hong Kong Arts Centre. These two museums are considered to be the top two art museums in Hong Kong that dictate the discourse of art in Hong Kong.

It has an extended branch, the Flagstaff House Museum of Tea Ware, at the Hong Kong Park in Central.

History
The museum was established as the City Museum and Art Gallery in the City Hall in Central by the Urban Council on 2 March 1962. This was split into the Hong Kong Museum of History and the Hong Kong Museum of Art in July 1975.

The Museum of History moved to Kowloon Park in 1983. Before leaving City Hall in 1991, the art museum occupied the 8th (rear portion), 9th, 10th, and 11th storeys of the High Block. These floors now house a public library. In 1991, it was moved to the present premises at 10 Salisbury Road, near the Hong Kong Cultural Centre and the Hong Kong Space Museum, in Tsim Sha Tsui. 

The new museum was formally inaugurated by Governor Chris Patten on 11 September 1992.

The museum closed on 3 August 2015 for a $400 million expansion and renovation. It reopened on 30 November 2019.

Exhibitions
The museum changes its displays regularly. The exhibitions in the museum are mainly of paintings, calligraphy and sculpture from Hong Kong, China and other parts of the world. It has cooperated with other museums as well.

From 25 May to 4 July 1962, the museum (then still named the Hong Kong City Hall Museum and Art Gallery) held the major exhibition, Hong Kong Art Today. It was significant as the first exhibition with Hong Kong art as its theme. The exhibition also reflected how naturalism in art had become passé and that abstract art was favoured at that moment in time.

Since 1975, the museum has hosted the Hong Kong Art Biennial Exhibition featuring the work of contemporary Hong Kong artists. It was renamed the Hong Kong Contemporary Art Biennial Awards in 2009.

Transportation
The museum is within walking distance of both East Tsim Sha Tsui station and Tsim Sha Tsui station of the Mass Transit Railway (MTR). It is even nearer the Tsim Sha Tsui Ferry Pier, which offers services to Wan Chai and Central.

See also
 List of museums in Hong Kong

References

External links
 
Hong Kong Museum of Art within Google Arts & Culture

Art museums established in 1962
Art museums and galleries in Hong Kong
Museum of Art
1962 establishments in Hong Kong
Asian art museums in Russia